Saleumphone Sopraseut (born 5 October 1969) is a Laotian racewalker. He competed in the men's 20 kilometres walk at the 1992 Summer Olympics.

References

External links
 

1969 births
Living people
Athletes (track and field) at the 1992 Summer Olympics
Laotian male racewalkers
Olympic athletes of Laos
Place of birth missing (living people)